"Losing Myself" is a song by British singer Will Young. It was written by Young and Pascal Gabriel and produced by Richard X for his fifth studio album, Echoes (2011). The song samples the music contained in "Nightcall" by French musician Kavinsky which was the track used in the title sequence for the film Drive (2011). "Losing Myself" was released as the album's third single on 18 March 2012. It peaked at number 72 on the UK Singles Chart.

Music video
A music video to accompany the release of "Losing Myself," directed by Henry Scholfield, was first released onto YouTube on 13 February 2012 at a total length of three minutes and fifty-five seconds.

Track listing

Notes
 denotes additional producer
 denotes remix producer

Credits and personnel
 Pete Hofmann – additional producer, mixing engineer
 Alex Meadows – bass
 Jeremy Shaw – guitar
Pascal Gabriel – keyboards, programming, writer
 Tim Weller – drums
 Richard X – producer
 Will Young – vocals, writer

Charts

Release history

References

Will Young songs
2012 singles
Song recordings produced by Richard X
Songs written by Pascal Gabriel
Songs written by Will Young
2011 songs
Sony BMG singles